Bruno Schmidt (born 1968 in Belgium) is a former head chef.

During his tenure (1994-1999) at the Park Hotel Kenmare, he earned a Michelin star for his cooking for restaurant Park. In 1999 he left the culinary work to start an up market limousine company named "Pro Bus and Car Luxury Touring".

Bruno Schmidt is married and has six children.

Awards
 Michelin star 1994-1999

References

1968 births
Living people
Belgian chefs
Irish businesspeople
Irish chefs
People from Kenmare
Head chefs of Michelin starred restaurants